American comedian Bill Cosby has received 72 honorary degrees in recognition of his career in acting and comedy. 62 of these have since been revoked due to his now-overturned conviction on sexual assault charges. These include (listed in order of original awarding of degree):

References

Honorary degrees
Lists of honorary degree recipients